The following is a list of scholarly resources related to Jefferson Davis.

Biographies

Books (specialized studies)

 
 

 
 
  

 
 '
.

Journal Articles

Miscelleaneous
 .

Bibliographies of people
Jefferson Davis